HNLMS Douwe Aukes (ML 1, N 81) was a minelayer of the Royal Netherlands Navy. She was built in the Gusto shipyard at Schiedam as the lead ship of the Douwe Aukes class, and one of her early commanders was Eugène Lacomblé.

Service

Second World War
On 14 May 1940 the Douwe Aukes fled to the United Kingdom, picking up survivors from the sinking of the Johan Maurits van Nassau during the crossing. She was first stationed at Falmouth alongside her sister ship Van Meerlant and the HNLMS Medusa., and then at  Sheerness. From 29 April 1941 she was lent to the Royal Navy for anti-aircraft duties on the eastern English coast. She was also active in the D-Day landings. She was returned to the Dutch navy in 1945.

Post-war 
Post-war, the Douwe Aukes acted as a depot ship for the Mine Service, then from 1959 as accommodation for the Mine Service at Hellevoetsluis. She finally left service in 1960.

Notes

Sources
Mark, C. Schepen van de Koninklijke Marine in W.O. II Alkmaar: De Alk bv, 1997 94-103

Douwe Aukes-class minelayers
Ships built by Gusto Shipyard
1922 ships
World War II minelayers of the Netherlands